The 1942 Appalachian State Mountaineers football team was an American football team that represented Appalachian State Teachers College (now known as Appalachian State University) as a member of the North State Conference during the 1942 college football season. In their only year under head coach Beattie Feathers, the Mountaineers compiled an overall record of 5–2–1, with a mark of 2–2 in conference play, and finished 2nd in the NSC.

Schedule

References

Appalachian State
Appalachian State Mountaineers football seasons
Appalachian State Mountaineers football